Lewis Paige Beasley (born August 27, 1948) is a former professional baseball player. He played 25 games in Major League Baseball for the Texas Rangers in 1977, primarily as an outfielder.

External links

Major League Baseball outfielders
Texas Rangers players
Bluefield Orioles players
Miami Marlins (FSL) players
Dallas–Fort Worth Spurs players
Stockton Ports players
Pittsfield Rangers players
Spokane Indians players
Sacramento Solons players
Tucson Toros players
Baseball players from Virginia
1948 births
Living people
People from Caroline County, Virginia